is a Japanese manga series written and illustrated by Makoto Ogino. It was serialized in Shueisha's seinen manga magazine Weekly Young Jump from 1985 to 1989, with its chapters collected in 17 tankōbon volumes. It spawned four other manga series. The original manga was licensed in North America in 2020 by Manga Planet.

Peacock King was adapted into a 5-episode original video animation (OVA), released from 1988 to 1994, and licensed in North America by U.S. Manga Corps, under the title Spirit Warrior. Two live action films were released in 1988 and 1990.

Story
Kujaku is a Buddhist monk who specializes in exorcism and devil hunting. He is a member of Ura-Kōya, a secret organization in Japan that specializes in demon hunting. The goal of the Teachers of Eight Leaves is to revive Peacock King and Snake Queen, and allow them to fight each other to give birth to the ultimate . During the story, the Teachers of Eight Leaves tried various methods to achieve their goal, but were ultimately defeated by Kujaku and his friends.

Characters

A Kōya Hijiri monk in his twenties and the hero of the story. Most of the time, however, Kujaku behaves like the young man he is, being carefree, lecherous and a glutton. He uses a vajra in exorcisms.

A girl chosen by the god . She was found by Ura-Kouya in a village, where she was hated and feared by her spiritual powers. Being 12 to 15 years old through the story, Ashura is usually rebellious and feisty, and also has a crush on Kujaku, which makes her jealous in several instances. She also loves fashion and often changes her appearance from her natural blond hair. She has pyrokinetic abilities and can generate a great amount of spiritual energy to transfer to her allies.

Kujaku's greatest rival, a half-demon half-human Jukondō master who works as a mercenary. He is superhumanly strong and has regenerative abilities, and specializes in controlling evil spirits. Although he and Kujaku were enemies in their first encounter, they quickly became friends, which turned Onimaru into somewhat of a recurrent reinforcement ally for Kujaku and his friends.

Kujaku's second rival, the young heir of a Chinese clan of sorcerers named Hakka Sendo. Like Onimaru, he started as an enemy to Kujaku before joining forces with him and developing an uneasy friendship with him. He later falls in love with Kujaku's sister Tomoko, which causes him to give in to darkness in order to try to save her from her fate. After being saved by Kujaku, he marries Tomoko and has a son with her.

Kujaku's old master. He knew Kujaku's father and was entrusted with him. Despite his wisdom and age, he is a bit of an alcoholic and as perverted as his apprentice.

Head priest of Ura-Kōya and Kujaku's senpai. He tries to be much more serious about their work.

She became separated from Kujaku as a child and was brought up by a Neo-Nazi cult, which tried to wake up her spiritual power to use her as a weapon.

The mistress of the women's prayer room at Ura-Kōya. She is in love with Kujaku. Her guardian god is

Publication
Peacock King, written and illustrated by Makoto Ogino, was first serialized in Shueisha's seinen manga magazine Weekly Young Jump from 1985 to 1989. Its chapters were collected in seventeen tankōbon volumes, released from July 1, 1986, to May 1, 1990.

A sequel, was serialized in Weekly Young Jump from 1990 to 1992. Shueisha collected its chapters in eleven tankōbon volumes, released from February 1, 1991, to December 1, 1993.

A second sequel, was serialized in Weekly Young Jump from March 23, 2006, to October 22, 2009, and later in Monthly Young Jump from November 17, 2009, to February 16, 2010. Shueisha collected its chapters in twelve tankōbon volumes, released from August 18, 2006, to March 19, 2010.

A spin-off series, was serialized in Shogakukan's Monthly Big Comic Spirits from March 27, 2012, to June 27, 2019. Shogakukan collected its chapters in ten tankōbon volumes, released from October 30, 2012, to July 30, 2019.

A third sequel,  was published in Leed's Comic Ran Twins from October 26, 2012, to June 27, 2016, and later in Comic Ran from October 27, 2016, to June 27, 2019. Leed collected the chapters in five tankōbon volumes, released from December 27, 2013, to July 30, 2019.

Adaptations

Films
The manga has been adapted into two Hong Kong live action films, Peacock King and Saga of the Phoenix, both directed by Lam Ngai Kai. The former, released in 1988, stars Hiroshi Mikami and Yuen Biao as the two monks (Kujaku and a new character Kǒngquè, respectively), and Gloria Yip as Ashura. Gordon Liu and Philip Kwok appear in supporting roles.

Video games

Family Computer

The first of two Family Computer (Famicom) adventure games. In it the player takes the role of a band of heroes fighting against evil demons. The player interacts with the story by selecting actions from a list of options on screen (look, take, talk etc) and by a simple 'point-and-click interface. The game was released only in Japan for the Famicom on September 21, 1988 by Pony Canyon.

A graphic/point-and-click adventure. The player interacts with the story by selecting actions from a list of options on screen (look, take, talk etc) and by a simple 'point-and-click interface.  The graphics have been improved over its predecessor. It is also available on the MSX Japanese computer.  Released on the Nintendo Famicom by Pony Canyon in Japan on August 21, 1990.

Sega

Sega Mark III, September 23, 1988 (Released as SpellCaster in western markets)

Mega Drive, November 25, 1989 (Released as Mystic Defender in western markets)

Notes

References

External links
 

1985 manga
1988 anime OVAs
1988 films
1990 manga
1990 fantasy films
1994 anime OVAs
2006 manga
Action anime and manga
Buddhist comics
Central Park Media
Exorcism in anime and manga
Fantasy anime and manga
Fiction about psychic powers
Films about Buddhism
Films based on mythology
Hong Kong fantasy adventure films
Japanese fantasy adventure films
Master System games
Seinen manga
Shogakukan manga
Shueisha manga